Marian Hill is an American electronic duo from Philadelphia consisting of record producer Jeremy Lloyd and singer Samantha Gongol.

The duo released their debut EP, Play, in 2014, and released their second EP, Sway, in 2015. The duo released four singles throughout 2016, leading up to their debut album Act One.

History
After meeting each other at Haverford High School, Lloyd studied music theatre at Yale University, Gongol then attended Muhlenberg College before transferring to music business at New York University, and music industry at Drexel University.

In April 2017, the duo released an extended version of their debut album Act One titled Act One (The Complete Collection).

Discography

Studio albums

EPs

Singles

Remixes
"Sweet Ophelia" by Zella Day (2014)
"Human" by Aquilo (2014)
"Earned It" by The Weeknd (2015)
"Hotline Bling" by Charlie Puth and Kehlani featuring Armani White (2015)
"Rain Dance" by Milk & Whisky (2016)
"Do You Miss Me at All" by Bridgit Mendler (2016)
"Electric" by Alina Baraz featuring Khalid (2017)
"Bellyache" by Billie Eilish (2017)
"Curious" by Hayley Kiyoko (2018)
"Same Soul" by PVRIS featuring Jaymes Young (2018)
"Sue Me" by Sabrina Carpenter (2019)
"I Lost A Friend" by FINNEAS (2019)
"If the World Was Ending" by JP Saxe (2019)
"Rewind" by Absofacto (2020)

References

External links

 

Musical groups from Philadelphia
American musical duos
Republic Records artists